The Aslanlı Tunnel, is a motorway tunnel constructed on the Adana–Şanlıurfa motorway    in Gaziantep Province, southern Turkey.

It is situated close to the provincial border of Gaziantep to Osmaniye in Nurdağı district. The -long twin-tube tunnel carrying three lanes of traffic in each direction follows the Kızlaç Tunnel in northeast direction. Dangerous goods carriers are not permitted to use the tunnel.

The tunnel was constructed by Tekfen in New Austrian Tunnelling method (NATM).

See also
List of motorway tunnels in Turkey

References

External links
 Map of road tunnels in Turkey  at General Directorate of Highways (Turkey) (KGM)

Road tunnels in Turkey
Transport in Gaziantep Province
Nurdağı District